Strandli is a Norwegian surname that may refer to
Are Strandli (born 1988), Norwegian rower
Frank Strandli (born 1972), Norwegian football striker
Martin Strandli (1890–1973), Norwegian trade unionist and politician
Sverre Strandli (1925–1985), Norwegian hammer thrower 

Norwegian-language surnames